Eschweilera beebei is a species of woody plant in the family Lecythidaceae. It is found only in Venezuela.

References

beebei
Flora of Venezuela
Vulnerable plants
Taxonomy articles created by Polbot